The Bird Seller is a 1953 West German musical film directed by Arthur Maria Rabenalt and starring Ilse Werner, Wolf Albach-Retty and Eva Probst.

An operetta film, it is one of several adaptations of the operetta The Bird Seller by Carl Zeller.

The film was made at the Bavaria Studios in Munich and shot in Agfacolor. The sets were designed by the art director Felix Smetana.

Cast
Ilse Werner as Fürstin Marie-Louise
Wolf Albach-Retty as Fürst
Eva Probst as Christel
Gerhard Riedmann as Adam
Sybil Werden as Jeanine
Günther Lüders as Weps
Erni Mangold as Ernestine
Siegfried Breuer as Marquis de Tréville
Hans Hermann Schaufuß as Johann
Rudolf Reiff as Chief forester

See also
The Bird Seller (1935)
Roses in Tyrol (1940)
Die Christel von der Post (1956)
The Bird Seller (1962)

References

External links

1950s historical musical films
German historical musical films
West German films
Films directed by Arthur Maria Rabenalt
Films based on operettas
Operetta films
Films shot at Bavaria Studios
1950s German films